Principle Group is an international brand implementation company headquartered in Huddersfield, UK, with offices in the USA, Mexico, Germany, France, Italy, Brazil, China, Japan, Russia, South Africa, Australia and India.

History 
Principle Group was established in 1987 in a rented office in a former textile mill in Scissett, Huddersfield. Founder Richard Butterfield remains the sole shareholder of the UK registered company.

Initially, the company offered a management service for the implementation of signage change to commercial buildings. Principle expanded its service offerings and the company was transformed from signage middleman into a global implementer of brand and corporate identity,
Its expansion has seen it open further UK offices in Northamptonshire, Leicestershire and London, along with international operations in Milan, Munich, Paris, Rio de Janeiro, Shanghai, Mumbai, Cape Town, Moscow, Tokyo, Mexico City and Brisbane. In February 2009, it launched a North American operating division based in Knoxville, Tennessee.  Principle has also established an international affiliate network to work on major projects.

In July 2014, Principle Group announced details of a £3 million plan to expand its presence in Huddersfield by redeveloping an industrial site adjacent to its head office. In May 2015, Simon Blagden MBE, the non-executive Chairman of Fujitsu Telecommunications Europe, joined Principle's board as a non-executive director. In 2016 Principle Group FD Victoria Woodings was promoted to the position of CEO.

Principle Group now supplies services to more than 60 countries and its clients include Chrysler, Accenture, TE Connectivity, Barclays, HSBC, Nissan, Royal Bank of Scotland Group, ArcelorMittal, BMW, Xerox, and Towers Watson.

In 2015, Principle became a sponsor of Clerkenwell Design Week.

Innovation 
In 2011, Principle Group designed and manufactured the world’s first solar-powered signage for green car manufacturer Fisker Automotive. The first installation took place at Century Automotive’s showroom in Huntsville, Alabama.

Principle Link, the facilities maintenance division of Principle Group, has developed two unique products designed to help its clients improve communication with hearing aid users. The patented Dual Amp Loop helps two hearing aid users to speak to and hear each other without the intrusion of excessive background noise, while Link Audio is a monitor arm which features integrated induction loop technology.

Awards 
The company won the Huddersfield Daily Examiner Business of the Year Award 2012 and the Examiner Creative Enterprise Award 2008.
In December 2013, Principle was named as one of the London Stock Exchange’s 1000 Companies To Inspire Britain. It was also included in the BDO 2015 Yorkshire Report detailing the region's top 250 businesses.

Principle chairman Richard Butterfield was named as a finalist in EY’s North of England Entrepreneur of the Year Awards 2014, while in March 2015, Victoria Woodings, CEO, was named as Rising Star at the inaugural Barclays Women in Business Awards.

In 2017 Principle achieved a hat trick of Sunday Times Awards - Grant Thornton Top Track 250, HSBC International Track 100 and the BDO Profit Track 100. Principle were also recognised as one of Mexico's most prestigious brands by Superbrands Mexico.

In 2018 Principle achieved the Queen's Award for Enterprise: International Trade and Global Brand Management Experts of the Year at the UK Enterprise Awards 2018. CEO Victoria Woodings was named as one of Yorkshire's most inspirational business women in the Yorkshire Business Insider Magazine, whilst Chairman and founder Richard Butterfield was recognised as a game-changing entrepreneur in the Maserati 100.

References

External links 
 Official Website

Marketing companies established in 1987
Companies based in Huddersfield
Branding companies of the United Kingdom